Erias Lukwago Ssalongo (born 11 May 1970), is a Ugandan lawyer and politician. He is the lord mayor of the city of Kampala, the capital of Uganda and the largest metropolitan area in the country. He was first elected to that position on 14 January 2011.

He was voted out of office on 25 November 2013 by councillors after a tribunal found him guilty of incompetence and abuse of office. The Kampala Capital City Authority councillors voted 29 to 3 to impeach him. He was re-instated on 28 November 2013 after the high court judge Yasin Nyanzi ordered Kampala minister Frank Tumwebaze to stop the implementation of the tribunal report that paved way for his censure.

In May 2021, Erias Lukwago was sworn in as lord mayor of Kampala, for the third term (2021 - 2026).

Background and education 
He was born in Kabungo Village, in present-day Kalungu District, on 11 May 1970, to Muhhamoud Mirundi and Salmati Nakayaga. Lukwago is reported to have more than twenty siblings.
Lukwago attended Makerere University between 1995 until 1997, graduating with a Bachelor of Laws degree. He went on to obtain a Diploma in Legal Practice from the Law Development Center in 1998. He also holds a Certificate in Advocacy Skills from the International Law Institute.

Work experience
Since 1998, Lukwago has worked as the managing partner in the offices of Lukwago and Company Advocates, a Kampala-based law firm that specializes in constitutional law and human rights law. In 2005, he was elected to the Ugandan Parliament, on the Democratic Party ticket, representing the Central Kampala Constituency. He resigned from Parliament in 2011 and was elected Lord Mayor of the City of Kampala. Lukwago has in the past served as national legal adviser to the Democratic Party in Uganda, and as Shadow Minister for Justice and Constitutional Affairs.

On 20 May 2011, Lukwago was sworn in as Lord Mayor of Kampala for a five-year term. In 2016 he was sworn in for his second term. On 26 May 2021, he swore in for his third term as the Lord Mayor of Kampala Capital City.

Personal life
Erias Lukwago is married to Zawedde Lubwama Lukwago and they have six children including twins.  He has in the past been a member of the Democratic Party in Uganda, although in the 2011 elections he ran as an independent. On 28 July 2020, he officially joined the Forum for Democratic Change, (FDC) political party.

See also
 Kampala Capital City Authority

References

External links
 How the City Mayoral Seat Was Won In 2011
 Kampala: What New City Executives Will Do

1970 births
Living people
Ugandan Muslims
Mayors of Kampala
Members of the Parliament of Uganda
Democratic Party (Uganda) politicians
Forum for Democratic Change politicians
Ugandan activists
20th-century Ugandan lawyers
Makerere University alumni
People from Kampala District
Ganda people
Law Development Centre alumni
21st-century Ugandan politicians
Impeached mayors removed from office